Chachas Lake is a lake in Peru located in the Arequipa Region, Castilla Province, Chachas District. Chachas Lake lies southwest of the Ch'ila mountain range, near the town of Chachas.

References 

Lakes of Peru
Lakes of Arequipa Region